Raymond Delatouche (1906–2002) was a French farmer and historian.

1906 births
2002 deaths
French farmers
École Nationale des Chartes alumni
21st-century farmers
20th-century farmers